Mary Burzminski (born 12 November 1960) is a Canadian middle-distance runner. She competed in the women's 800 metres at the 1988 Summer Olympics.

References

External links
 
 
 
 
 

1960 births
Living people
Athletes (track and field) at the 1988 Summer Olympics
Canadian female middle-distance runners
Olympic track and field athletes of Canada
World Athletics Championships athletes for Canada
People from Smoky Lake County
Sportspeople from Alberta